Lenina "Linse" Coleman (born Lenina Christiansen) better known as Linse Kessler (born 31 March 1966) is a Danish television personality, actress and businesswoman. She is known for her ownership of "Scandinavia's largest silicone breasts" and for being the older sister of former professional boxer Mikkel Kessler. Linse is currently the star of her own reality series, Familien fra Bryggen.

Background
She was born on 31 March 1966. Her parents were typographer Ole Christansen and Ann Patricia Coleman. 
Her birth name was Lenina Christiansen. 
Officially she was never named Linse Kessler. In 2019 she changed her name to Coleman which was her mothers maiden name. The name change was according to the Danish magazine BT to give her better business opportunities - she has now created care products.

Career
Kessler gained popularity in Denmark through her acquisition of breast implants.  Beginning in 1991, Kessler began getting breast augmentation surgeries.  Her first set of implants augmentated each of her breasts to 340 cc of silicone.  Kessler gradually continued to make her breasts bigger throughout the 1990s, from 340 cc to 420 cc, then 800 cc, then 1,200 cc and finally 1,600 cc. In 1999, Kessler was featured in Extrem, a Danish TV documentary series, in which she is followed and called "Denmark's Largest Breasts".

In 2004, Kessler made her acting debut in a Danish mainstream crime film,  Pusher II: With Blood on My Hands.  In the film, Kessler plays a minor role as Jeanette, a gangster's ex-wife and prostitute, who is targeted for murder.  In 2005, Kessler reprised her role as Jeanette in Pusher 3, in which her character is now a pimp involved in sex trafficking. In 2009, Kessler played another minor role as a seductive mistress in Nedenunder, a short film directed by Anne-Grethe Bjarup Riis.

In 2008, Kessler announced that she would be having breast reduction surgery, to remove 400 cc of silicone from her implants.  According to Kessler, she wanted to make her implants smaller because of her retirement from modeling.

In 2013, she appeared in the single "Lidt for blond" credited to Ronni Garner featuring Linse Kessler. The single charted in the Tracklisten, the official Danish Singles Chart making it to number 17 in its first week of release.

Television career
Familien fra Bryggen
In September 2011, Kessler and her family began starring on a reality television show titled Familien fra Bryggen on the Danish TV3 channel.  The show followed the daily lives of Kessler, her daughter Stephanie, her mother Ann, and her boxer brother Mikkel in their home in the Islands Brygge section of Copenhagen.

Others
In January 2012, Kessler guest-starred on Paradise Hotel.  In August 2012, Kessler began starring on Gustav og Linse på udebane, or Gustav and Linse Away, in which she travels the world with her co-host.

Personal life
Kessler used to own the Copenhagen Redlight strip club in the Nyhavn district of Copenhagen. She opened a tattoo salon called Artistico in 2014, which was later sold. Kessler has had several run-ins with the law; she was convicted of drug charges, threats against witnesses, and assault. She has served time at the Horserød camp and the Vestre Fængsel prison.

Discography

Singles

Featured in

References

External links

 Official Site of Linse Kessler
 
 Official Site of Copenhagen Redlight Club

1966 births
Danish people of English descent
Danish film actresses
Danish female models
Living people
People from Copenhagen
People convicted of drug offenses